Kipruto Rono Arap Kirwa (born 1957) is a Kenyan politician.

Early life and education
Kirwa was born in Tanganyika, currently Republic of Tanzania. His father, Kiprono Arap Sirng'ewo was a farmer and livestock keeper, who was among the Nandi people evicted from their fertile ancestral lands by the British colonialists in Nandi County to pave the way for white settlers to develop the area that became the white Highlands in the Rift Valley. The late colonial senior chief Elijah Cheruiyot oversaw the issuing of the temporary British permit that allowed the families to enter the northern Tanganyika, settling in Mara, Musoma, Bunda and Mwanza in 1951.

His father begrudgingly settled there though he did not plan to live there for long. According to his parents, life had moved from bad to worse in their new unproductive foreign home. After Kenya attained it's independence, they moved back to Kenya around mid 1960s, settling in Cherangany, Trans Nzoia County. Kirwa started his elementary education and later secondary education in Kenya, and he excelled culminating in his admission to the Egerton University where he acquired his tertiary education.

He hold two master's degrees; Master of Science in Applied Management and Leadership from The Management University of Africa, and Master of Arts in International Studies from the University of Nairobi. He is also pursuing further studies at the University of Nairobi which will lead to PhD in International Studies.

Political career 
He was elected to represent the Cherangany Constituency in the national assembly of Kenya at the age of 33 during the 1990 by-election. He was re-elected consecutively during the 1992, 1997 and 2002 Kenyan general elections. He served as a member of parliament at the National Assembly of Kenya for approximately two decades.

When the NARC led by President Mwai Kibaki swept into the power during the 2002 Kenyan general election, Kirwa was appointed to serve as the Minister for Agriculture. Later he was nominated to serve as IGAD Special Envoy to Somalia Peace and National Reconciliation from 2008 to 2012.

Personal life
Kirwa is married with four children.

References

Living people
Members of the National Assembly (Kenya)
Ministers of Agriculture of Kenya
1957 births